Francis James Gray (31 August 1880 – 2 March 1935) was a British politician and welfare campaigner. He served as a Liberal Member of Parliament for Oxford from 1922 to 1924.

Background
He was born in Oxford and educated at Rugby School.

Career
He was admitted as a solicitor in 1903; he retired from law in 1916, and entered the Army. He refused a commission, and served as a private soldier in the Oxfordshire and Buckinghamshire Light Infantry and The Princess Charlotte of Wales's (Royal Berkshire Regiment) until the Armistice. In 1920 he published The Confessions of a Private.

After the war, he worked as a farm labourer, lived with Warwickshire miners, and toured the workhouses of Oxfordshire as a tramp. He wrote the book The Tramp: his Meaning and Being (London: Dent, 1931).

Politics
In the 1918 general election he contested Watford. He was elected as the MP for Oxford in the 1922 general election 

He was made a Liberal whip. He was re-elected in 1923;

He was accused of corrupt practices in the 1923 general election. Following a petition raised by his Unionist opponent, he was unseated by the courts on 14 May 1924 because his agent had falsified the account for his expenses. He was acquitted of corrupt practices but prevented from standing for parliament for seven years. In 1930 Oxford Liberal Association approached him to stand as their candidate at the next General Election but he declined.

In 1926, he crossed Africa from the Atlantic to the Red Sea in a car.

He died while returning from South Africa to Southampton, having traveled there for his health.

See also
1924 Oxford by-election

Further reading
Charles Fenby, The other Oxford: the life and times of Frank Gray and his father (London: Lund Humphries, 1970)

External links 

Obituary in The Times, 4 March 1935

References

1880 births
1935 deaths
People from Oxford
Military personnel from Oxfordshire
People educated at Rugby School
English solicitors
Oxfordshire and Buckinghamshire Light Infantry soldiers
Royal Berkshire Regiment soldiers
British Army personnel of World War I
Liberal Party (UK) MPs for English constituencies
UK MPs 1922–1923
UK MPs 1923–1924
20th-century English lawyers